A 6×4 or six-by-four is a vehicle with three axles, with a drivetrain delivering power to two wheel ends on two of them.  It is a form of four-wheel drive but not one of all-wheel drive.

It is the most common form of drivetrain of semi-tractors and heavy haul fixed-chassis cargo trucks in larger countries such as the United States and Australia; in Europe, 4×2 and 6×2 variants are more commonplace.

See also
 Four-wheel drive
 Six-wheel drive

References

Off-road vehicles
Car layouts
Drivetrain